The Bayan Har block or Bayan Kola block is an elongate wedge-shaped block that forms part of the eastern Tibetan Plateau. It is bounded to the southeast by the Longmenshan Fault, a major thrust fault zone, which forms the active tectonic boundary between the plateau and the Sichuan Basin. To the northeast, the boundary is formed by the Kunlun and Minjaing Faults juxtaposing the block against the Eastern Kunlun-Qaidam block and to the southwest by the Xianshuihe fault system forms its boundary with the Qiangtang block. All of these are major left-lateral strike-slip fault zones. The block is currently moving to the southeast relative to the South China block.

Seismicity
Earthquakes are mainly concentrated on the faults bounding the block, such as the 2001 Kunlun earthquake (on the Kunlun Fault), the 2008 Sichuan earthquake (on the Longmenshan Fault) and the 1973 Luhuo earthquake, 1981 Dawu earthquake and 2010 Yushu earthquake (all on the Xianshuihe fault system). In May 2021, the block hosted the Maduo earthquake; upon further analysis, found that the intraplate earthquake occurred on a fault within the block.

References

Geology of China
Tibetan Plateau